Viktor Aleksandrovich Kuznetsov (born 21 May 1961) is a former backstroke swimmer from the Soviet Union. He won two silver medals at the boycotted 1980 Summer Olympics in Moscow, USSR.

External links
 
 
 

1961 births
Living people
Russian male swimmers
Soviet male swimmers
Male backstroke swimmers
Swimmers at the 1980 Summer Olympics
Olympic swimmers of the Soviet Union
Olympic silver medalists for the Soviet Union
Place of birth missing (living people)
European Aquatics Championships medalists in swimming
Medalists at the 1980 Summer Olympics
Olympic silver medalists in swimming
Universiade medalists in swimming
Universiade bronze medalists for the Soviet Union
Medalists at the 1983 Summer Universiade